The Lakewood Church Central Campus is the main facility of Lakewood Church, a megachurch in Houston, Texas, five miles southwest of Downtown Houston and next to Greenway Plaza.

From 1975 to 2003 the building served as a multi-purpose sports arena for professional teams, notably the NBA's Houston Rockets. It was known as The Summit until 1998, when technology firm Compaq bought naming rights and dubbed it Compaq Center. That name was dropped when Toyota Center opened as a new and more advanced professional sports venue in the same city, and the building was leased to Lakewood Church. Seven years later, in 2010, the church bought the building outright.

Construction of The Summit

In 1971, the National Basketball Association's San Diego Rockets were purchased by new ownership group Texas Sports Investments, who moved the franchise to Houston.  The city, however, lacked an indoor arena suitable to host a major sports franchise.  The largest arena in the city at the time was 34-year-old Sam Houston Coliseum, but the Rockets would not even consider using it as a temporary facility.  Plans were immediately undertaken to construct the new venue that would become The Summit.  The Rockets played their home games in various local facilities such as Hofheinz Pavilion and the Astrodome during the interim.

Completed in 1975 at a cost of $18 million, there was an Opening Night Spectacular called "Heart To Heart", benefitting the Baylor College of Medicine, The Methodist Hospital, and the Texas Heart Institute. Andy Williams was the headliner for that evening's extravaganza. The Summit represented a lavish new breed of sports arena, replete with amenities, that would help the NBA grow from a second-tier professional sport into the multibillion-dollar entertainment industry that it is today.  The Omni in Atlanta (now the site of State Farm Arena), McNichols Sports Arena in Denver (now a parking lot for Empower Field at Mile High), and the Richfield Coliseum in Richfield, Ohio (now an open meadow in the process of being reclaimed by forest) were all constructed during this period and remained in service until the continued growth of the NBA sparked a new arena construction boom in the late 1990s.

On each end of the arena was a Fair-Play scoreboard with a small two-line monochrome message center.  Both scoreboards would be upgraded in 1986 with the addition of three front-projection videoboards on top of each scoreboard.  The center videoboard showed live game footage, fan shots, and replays while the left and right videoboards showed slides displaying advertisements for the Rockets' (and Aeros') sponsors.

Notable events

Sports
The Summit housed the Rockets, Aeros, Comets and several arena football sports teams until they vacated the arena in favor of the new Toyota Center in downtown Houston. Additionally, the arena was a prime Houston venue for popular music concerts and special events such as Ringling Bros. and Barnum & Bailey Circus, the Harlem Globetrotters, Sesame Street Live and Disney on Ice.

The NBA Finals were hosted by The Summit in 1981, 1986, 1994, and 1995, including the deciding games of 1994 and 1995, and the celebrations that followed. The Summit also hosted the WNBA championships of 1997 through 2000, all of which were won by the Houston Comets.

The first professional wrestling event at the Summit was promoted by Houston Wrestling on May 29, 1977,  headlined by the American Wrestling Association World Heavyweight Champion Nick Bockwinkel drawing Terry Funk. On January 7, 1979, Dusty Rhodes won the NWA Texas Brass Knuckles Championship from Mark Lewin. The World Wrestling Federation aired the first TV card from the venue on October 19, 1986, featuring Hulk Hogan defending his title against Paul Orndorff and a $50,000 tag team battle royal. It held the Royal Rumble on January 15, 1989. This was the first time the Royal Rumble, won by Big John Studd, was televised on pay-per-view (PPV). The newly renamed Compaq Center hosted the No Way Out of Texas PPV on February 15, 1998, and Bad Blood (the first brand-exclusive PPV held in the United States) on June 15, 2003. It hosted a live episode of SmackDown! on September 13, 2001, the first major entertainment event in the US after the September 11 attacks.

Notable concerts
Prior to the construction of Cynthia Woods Mitchell Pavilion and later, the Toyota Center, the Summit was the main Houston venue for large pop and rock music concerts. Before the Summit was opened, most large venue concerts were held at the Sam Houston Coliseum. Smaller concerts were held at Houston Music Hall or Hofheinz Pavilion.

From vacancy to church

In 1998, it became the first Houston sports arena to sell its naming rights. The Arena Operating Company entered into a five-year, $900,000 per year deal with then Houston-based Compaq Computer Corporation to change the name of the venue from The Summit to Compaq Center, keeping that name even after the acquisition of Compaq by Hewlett-Packard in 2002 (there was another arena named the Compaq Center in San Jose, California around this time, but has since been renamed the SAP Center). The length of the agreement was significant, because in 2003 the lease that Arena Operating Company held on Compaq Center would expire, and the tenants of the building were lobbying vigorously for the construction of a new downtown venue to replace the aging and undersized arena.

When the sports teams moved to the new Toyota Center in 2003, the City of Houston leased the arena to Lakewood Church, a megachurch, which invested $95 million in renovations to convert the arena into the current configuration of seats and rooms for its needs; the renovations took over 15 months to complete, and the renovations included adding five stories to add more capacity. During the lease, Lakewood Church had an exclusive agreement with the City of Houston for use of the former Summit, and as such, invested heavily in the structure for its use.  In 2001, the church signed a 30-year lease with the city.

In March 2010, the church announced that it would buy the campus outright from the city of Houston for $7.5 million, terminating the lease after 7 years. Marty Aaron, a real estate appraiser, said that while an "untrained eye" would "wonder how Lakewood Church purchased the Compaq Center for $7.5 million, when this is not really an arms-length sale from the city to Lakewood Church." Aaron explained that the church "put a phenomenal amount of money into the facility after the lease was initially structured, and it's really not fair that someone else would get the benefit of that." Aaron added that converting the property to a stadium-oriented facility "would probably cost as much or more than it took to turn it into a church, and right now there are probably not very many organizations that would be willing to step forward and do that." The Houston City Council was scheduled to vote on the matter on Wednesday March 24, 2010. City council delayed the vote. On March 30 of that year, Ronald Green, the city's chief financial officer, said that he approved of the sale of the building. On March 31, 2010 the Houston City Council voted 13–2 to sell the property to Lakewood.

References

External links

Evangelical churches in Houston
Defunct basketball venues in the United States
Defunct indoor arenas in Texas
Defunct indoor soccer venues in the United States
Evangelical churches in Texas
Former music venues in the United States
Former National Basketball Association venues
Houston Rockets venues
Indoor ice hockey venues in the United States
Evangelical megachurches in the United States
Megachurches in Texas
Pentecostal churches in Texas
Churches completed in 1975
Trinity Broadcasting Network
Defunct sports venues in Texas
1975 establishments in Texas
Christian organizations established in 1975